Brittany Fraser-Beaulieu (born August 27, 1988) is a Canadian Olympic equestrian competing in the dressage discipline.

Career
Fraser-Beaulieu competed at the 2015 Pan American Games in Toronto, winning the silver medal in the team dressage and finishing fourth in the individual event. 

Fraser-Beaulieu was part of the Canada's 2020 Olympic team, where she finished 18th in the individual final.

References

1988 births
Canadian female equestrians
Living people
People from New Glasgow, Nova Scotia
Equestrians at the 2015 Pan American Games
Equestrians at the 2020 Summer Olympics
Olympic equestrians of Canada
Medalists at the 2015 Pan American Games
Pan American Games silver medalists for Canada
Pan American Games medalists in equestrian
20th-century Canadian women
21st-century Canadian women